Aquilegia pubescens is a high-altitude species of columbine known by the common names Sierra columbine, alpine columbine and Coville's columbine. Its flowers are large and usually a creamy white.

Distribution and habitat
This wildflower is endemic to California, where it is a resident of the High Sierra. It is found in alpine and subalpine climates, often on open, rocky slopes, between 8,000 and 12,000 ft.

Description
This leafy columbine rarely reaches half a meter-1.5 feet in height. The showy flowers are erect or spreading, rather than drooping. The characteristic spurs may be up to 5 centimeters long and the flowers up to 5 cm wide. The sepals (outer ring) and the petals (inner, with spurs) are generally cream or white, less often pink or yellow. The round, fused mouth protrudes, enclosing a cluster of long yellow stamens.

Hybrids
Aquilegia pubescens can hybridize with the lower-elevation Aquilegia formosa (crimson columbine) where their ranges overlap. This produces flowers with intermediate color, spur length, and orientation, as shown in the transition-series image, providing a change also in pollinator species: hawkmoths for A. pubescens and hummingbirds for A. formosa.

Gallery

References

External links
Jepson Manual Treatment - Aquilegia pubescens
Aquilegia pubescens - Photo gallery

pubescens
Endemic flora of California
Flora of the Sierra Nevada (United States)
Alpine flora